This is a list of films and miniseries that are based on actual events. All films on this list are from American production unless indicated otherwise.

2020 
 2 Hearts (2020) – romantic drama based on the true story of Leslie and Jorge Bacardi and Christopher Gregory
 18 Presents (Italian: 18 regali) (2020) – Italian drama film based on an actual Italian woman, Elisa Girotto, who had planned and allocated 17 years of birthday gifts for her daughter Anna before her death in September 2017 due to a terminal breast cancer. 
 AK-47 (Russian: Kalashnikov) (2020) – Russian biographical film about the experiences of Mikhail Kalashnikov, inventor of the AK-47 assault rifle
 Alex Wheatle (2020) – made-for-television historical drama film about Alex Wheatle, a Black British novelist who was sentenced to a term of imprisonment after the 1981 Brixton uprising
 Ammonite (2020) – British-Australian romantic drama film written and directed by Francis Lee. It is based on the life of English fossil collector, dealer, and palaeontologist Mary Anning
 BAC Nord (2020) – French crime drama film  based on a scandal that took place in 2012 within the anti-crime brigade (BAC) of Marseille: eighteen of its members had been referred to correctional for drug trafficking and racketeering
 The Banker (2020) – drama film following Joe Morris and Bernard Garrett, two of the first African-American bankers in the United States who bought banks in Texas to give lending opportunities to blacks who aspired to own homes and start business, while Jim Crow laws made such ambitions nearly impossible in the Deep South in the 1950s
 Barbarians (German: Barbaren) (2020) – German historical war drama miniseries based on events during the Roman Empire's occupation of Germania, and the resulting rebellion of the Germanic tribes led by Arminius.
 Beans (2020) – Canadian drama film directed by Mohawk filmmaker Tracey Deer, telling the story of the Oka Crisis, which Deer experienced herself as a child, through the story of Tekehentahkhwa (nicknamed "Beans"), a young Mohawk girl whose perspective on life is radically changed by the events of the crisis
 Betrayer (2020) – Czech made-for-television historical drama film about Emanuel Moravec
 Beyond That Mountain (Korean:Jeo San Neo-meo) (2020) – South Korean biographical film about the childhood of Stephen Kim Sou-hwan, former Cardinal of the Roman Catholic Church and Archbishop of Seoul
 Blackjack: The Jackie Ryan Story (2020) – biographical sports drama film depicting the story of Brooklyn-based streetball player Jack Ryan
 Capone (2020) – biographical film starring Tom Hardy as the notorious gangster Al Capone
 Caught in Time (Chinese: Chúbào) (2020) – Chinese crime film based on the robber and serial killer Zhang Jun
 Charlatan (Czech: Šarlatán) (2020) – Czech-Polish-Irish-Slovak drama film based on the healer Jan Mikolášek (1889–1973), who cured hundreds of people using plant-based remedies
 Chhapaak (2020) – Indian Hindi-language drama film based on the life of Laxmi Agarwal
 The Clark Sisters: First Ladies of Gospel (2020) – biographical film about Gospel group The Clark Sisters
 Clouds (2020) – biographical romantic musical drama teen film based upon the memoir Fly a Little Higher: How God Answered a Mom's Small Prayer in a Big Way by Laura Sobiech about the life of Zach Sobiech, a teenager from Minnesota who had osteosarcoma and decided to follow his dream of becoming a musician, after finding out he is dying
 The Courier (2020) – historical spy film starring Benedict Cumberbatch as Greville Wynne, a British businessman who was recruited by the Secret Intelligence Service to deliver messages to secret agent Oleg Penkovsky during the Cuban Missile Crisis in the 1960s
 Critical Thinking (2020) – biographical drama film  based on the true story of the 1998 Miami Jackson High School chess team
 Curveball (2020) – German political satire film based on true events leading up to the Iraq War of 2003.
 De Gaulle (2020) – French biographical historical drama film based on married couple, Charles de Gaulle and his wife Yvonne, during military and political collapse as the Battle of France rages
 Des (2020) – British drama miniseries based on the 1983 arrest of Scottish serial killer Dennis Nilsen after the discovery of human remains causing the blockage of a drain near his home
 Dream Horse (2020) – drama film about thoroughbred racehorse Dream Alliance who won the 2009 Welsh Grand National Race
 The Duke (2020) – British drama film based on the real-life theft of the Portrait of the Duke of Wellington
 The East (Dutch: De Oost) (2020) – Dutch war film set in the Dutch East Indies of 1946 during the Indonesian National Revolution
 Education (2020) – drama film based on real-life events of the 1970s, when some London councils followed an unofficial policy of transferring disproportionate numbers of black children from mainstream education to schools for the so-called "educationally subnormal"
 The Eight Hundred (Chinese: 八佰) (2020) – Chinese historical war drama film based on real life events: the defense of Sihang Warehouse in 1937 Shanghai by Chinese NRA troops during the Battle of Shanghai and the Second Sino-Japanese War
 Emperor (2020) – historical drama film based on the true story of Shields Green, an African American slave nicknamed "Emperor", who escaped to freedom and participated in abolitionist John Brown's raid on Harpers Ferry
 Escape from Pretoria (2020) – biographical thriller film based on the real-life prison escape by three young political prisoners from jail in South Africa in 1979
 Fatima (2020) – faith-based drama film based on the 1917 Our Lady of Fátima events
 The Forgotten Battle (Dutch: De Slag om de Schelde) (2020) – Dutch World War II film depicting the Battle of the Scheldt in 1944
 Forgotten We'll Be (Spanish: El olvido que seremos) (2020) – Colombian drama film based on the true story of Héctor Abad Gómez, a Colombian university professor who challenges the country's establishment.
 Four Good Days (2020) – drama film based upon Eli Saslow's 2016 Washington Post article "How's Amanda? A Story of Truth, Lies and an American Addiction"
 Fukushima 50 (2020) – Japanese drama film based on the Fukushima Daiichi nuclear disaster which was caused by the 2011 Tōhoku earthquake and tsunami
 The Glorias (2020) – biographical film starring Julianne Moore as American activist and journalist Gloria Steinem
 Grant (2020) – Historical drama miniseries chronicling the life of Ulysses S. Grant, the eighteenth President of the United States, and premiered on May 25, 2020 on History.
 The Great (2020) – comedy miniseries loosely based on the rise of Catherine the Great, Empress of Russia
 Greyhound (2020) – war film based on the 1955 novel The Good Shepherd by C. S. Forester
 Gunjan Saxena: The Kargil Girl (2020) – Indian biographical drama film starring Janhvi Kapoor as Indian Air Force pilot Gunjan Saxena, one of the first Indian female air-force pilots in combat
 Hamilton – historical fiction musical drama film inspired by the 2004 biography Alexander Hamilton by Ron Chernow
 Havel (2020) – Czech historical film based on the life of dissident and former Czech president Václav Havel
 The Heist of the Century (Spanish: El robo del siglo) (2020) – Argentine comedy thriller  based on a true story, the robbery of the Banco Río branch in the Buenos Aires town of Acassuso on January 13, 2006, which was attacked by a gang of six robbers armed with toy weapons
 Honour (2020) – British drama miniseries depicting the investigation into the real-life disappearance and murder of honour killing victim Banaz Mahmod
 I Carry You with Me (Spanish: Te Llevo Conmigo) (2020) – Mexican Spanish-language romantic-drama film based on the true story of an aspiring chef and a teacher and the societal pressures they faced
 I Still Believe (2020) – Christian biographical drama film based on the life of singer-songwriter Jeremy Camp and his first wife, Melissa Lynn Henning-Camp, who was diagnosed with ovarian cancer shortly before they married
 I Was Lorena Bobbitt (2020) – biographical drama film about John and Lorena Bobbitt, a Virginia couple whose troubled marriage became international news in 1993 when Lorena cut off her husband's penis with a knife
 The Investigation (Danish: Efterforskningen) (2020) – Danish crime drama miniseries based on the investigation of the death of Kim Wall, a 30-year-old Swedish journalist
 Joe Bell (2020) – biographical drama road film following the true story of a father and his gay son who set out to bond while walking across the country
 Leap (2020) – Chinese biographical sports film based on the China women's national volleyball team's stories spread over more than 40 years
 The Liberator (2020) – adult animated war drama miniseries about World War II where maverick U.S. Army officer Felix Sparks and the 157th Infantry Regiment fought for over five hundred days alongside the Allied forces during the Italian campaign
 Lost Girls (2020) – drama mystery film based on the life of American activist and murder victim advocate Mari Gilbert, a woman tirelessly looking for her missing daughter Shannan, during her search, police found 10 other bodies across Long Island during the Long Island killings
 Ma Rainey's Black Bottom (2020) – biographical drama film based on the 1982 play of the same name by August Wilson, focusing on Ma Rainey, an influential blues singer, and dramatises a turbulent recording session in 1920s Chicago
 The Man Standing Next (2020) – South Korean political drama film telling the story of the high-ranking officials of the Korean government and the Korean Central Intelligence Agency (KCIA) during the presidency of Park Chung-hee 40 days before his assassination in 1979
 Mank (2020) – biographical drama film about screenwriter Herman J. Mankiewicz, and his battles with director Orson Welles over screenplay credit for Citizen Kane (1941)
 The Marijuana Conspiracy (2020) – Canadian drama film based on a group of young women in 1972, who have been confined to a hospital for 98 days and made to smoke marijuana daily as part of a medical research study into the effects of cannabis on women.
 Misbehaviour (2020) – British comedy drama about Jennifer Hosten, the first black competitor in the 1970 Miss World competition
 Minamata (2020) – biographical drama film starring Johnny Depp as W. Eugene Smith, an American photojournalist who documented the effects of mercury poisoning on the citizens of Minamata, Kumamoto, Japan
 Mrs. America (2020) – historical drama depicting the unsuccessful political movement to pass the Equal Rights Amendment and the unexpected backlash led by conservative activist Phyllis Schlafly in the 1970s
 My Left Nut (2020) – Northern Irish comedy-drama miniseries drawing heavily on Michael Patrick's own teenage years, following a 15-year old as he discovers a swelling on his left testicle
 The One and Only Ivan (2020) – fantasy drama film inspired by the true story of Ivan the gorilla
 One Night in Miami... (2020) – drama film depicting a fictionalized account of a real February 1964 meeting of Malcolm X, Muhammad Ali, Jim Brown, and Sam Cooke in a room at the Hampton House, celebrating Ali's surprise title win over Sonny Liston
 Operation Buffalo (2020) – Australian comedy-drama miniseries inspired by true events of British nuclear bomb tests in the 1950s at remote Maralinga, in outback South Australia, specifically the four tests codenamed Operation Buffalo
 Operation Christmas Drop (2020) – Christmas romantic comedy film loosely based on the real-life U.S. Air Force Operation Christmas Drop humanitarian mission
 The Outpost (2020) – war film based on the 2012 non-fiction book The Outpost: An Untold Story of American Valor by Jake Tapper
 Penguin Bloom (2020) – Australian/American drama film based on the book of the same name about the struggling Bloom family in the aftermath of an accident which left Sam Bloom with partial paralysis
 Percy (2020) – Canadian-American-Indian biographical drama film about 70-year-old small-town Saskatchewan farmer Percy Schmeiser, who takes on a giant corporation after their GMOs interfere with his crops
 Quiz (2020) – British crime drama miniseries focusing on Charles Ingram, a former army major in the Royal Engineers, and how he unexpectedly won the £1,000,000 jackpot on the quiz show Who Wants to Be a Millionaire? in 2001, followed by a criminal trial in which he and his wife were convicted of cheating their way to success.
 Quo Vadis, Aida? (2020) – Bosnian film dramatizing the events of the Srebrenica massacre, during which Serbian troops sent Bosniak men and boys to death in July 1995 led by Serbian convicted war criminal Ratko Mladić 
 Resistance (2020) – biographical drama film based on the life of French actor and mime artist Marcel Marceau
 Rise of Empires: Ottoman (2020) – Turkish historical drama miniseries based on the Ottoman Empire and Mehmed the Conqueror and tells the story of the Fall of Constantinople
 Roald & Beatrix: The Tail of the Curious Mouse (2020) – made-for-television drama film inspired by the true story of a six-year-old Roald Dahl meeting his idol Beatrix Potter
 Roe V. Wade (2020) – political legal drama film that serves as a dramatization of the 1973 landmark decision of the same name, rendered by the U.S. Supreme Court on the issue of the constitutionality of laws that criminalized or restricted access to abortions
 Rose Island (Italian: L'incredibile storia dell'Isola delle Rose) (2020) – Italian comedy-drama film based on the true story of engineer Giorgio Rosa and the Republic of Rose Island.
 Safety (2020) – biographical sports drama family film based on the story of Ray McElrathbey, a football player who battled family adversity to join the Clemson Tigers
 The Salisbury Poisonings (2020) – British biographical drama miniseries which portrays the 2018 Novichok poisonings and decontamination crisis in Salisbury, England, and the subsequent Amesbury poisonings
 Self Made (2020) – biographical drama based on the biography On Her Own Ground by A'Lelia Bundles
 Sergio (2020) – biographical drama film about United Nations diplomat Sérgio Vieira de Mallo
 Shakuntala Devi (2020) – Indian Hindi-language biographical drama film tracing the life of mathematician Shakuntala Devi, who was also known as the "human computer"
 Shirley (2020) – biographical drama film about novelist Shirley Jackson's life during the time period she was writing her 1951 novel Hangsaman
 Sitting in Limbo (2020) – made-for-television drama film about the Windrush scandal focusing on the real-life experiences of a Jamaican-born British man, Anthony Bryan, one of the victims of the UK Home Office hostile environment policy on immigration
 Son of the South (2020) – biographical historical drama film, based on Bob Zellner's autobiography, The Wrong Side of Murder Creek: A White Southerner in the Freedom Movement
 Stardust (2020) – British-Canadian biographical film about English singer-songwriter David Bowie and his alter-ego Ziggy Stardust
 Street Survivors: The True Story of the Lynyrd Skynyrd Plane Crash (2020) – musical survival drama film about the rock band Lynyrd Skynyrd, whose plane crashed on 20 October 1977, killing three band members and the two pilots, while the tour plane ran out of fuel over Mississippi
 Suarez: The Healing Priest (2020) – Philippine biographical film depicting the life of Filipino priest and faith healer Fernando Suarez.
 Tanhaji (2020) – Indian Hindi-language biographical period action film set in the 17th century, and revolving around the life of Tanhaji Malusare, depicting his attempts to recapture the Kondhana fortress once it passes on to Mughal emperor Aurangzeb who transfers its control to his trusted guard Udaybhan Singh Rathore
 Tesla (2020) – biographical film about Serbian-American inventor, electrical engineer, mechanical engineer and futurist Nikola Tesla
 The Trial of the Chicago 7 (2020) – crime drama film based on the story of the Chicago Seven, a group of seven defendants charged by the federal government with conspiracy, inciting to riot, and other charges related to anti-Vietnam War and countercultural protests that took place in Chicago, Illinois, on the occasion of the 1968 Democratic National Convention
 Tove (2020) – Finnish biographical film of Swedo-Finnish author and illustrator Tove Jansson
 Washington (2020) – War drama miniseries chronicling the life of George Washington, the first President of the United States.
 White House Farm (2020) – British crime drama miniseries based on the real-life events that took place in August 1985
 The Windermere Children (2020) – biographical drama film based on the experience of child survivors of the Holocaust, it follows the children and staff of a camp set up on the Calgarth Estate  in Troutbeck Bridge, near Lake Windermere, England, where the survivors were helped to rehabilitate, rebuild their lives, and integrate into the British society
 Worth (2020) – biographical film depicting depicts Kenneth Feinberg's handing of the September 11th Victim Compensation Fund

2021 
 4 Kings (Thai: 4 KINGS อาชีวะ ยุค) (2021) – Thai drama-crime film based on actual events in Thai society about the issue of quarrels among teenage vocational students which injures unrelated persons as well
 12 Mighty Orphans (2021) – sports film based upon the non fiction book Twelve Mighty Orphans: The Inspiring True Story of the Mighty Mites Who Ruled Texas Football by Jim Dent
 83 (2021) – Indian Hindi-language sports drama film based on the India national cricket team led by Kapil Dev, which won the 1983 Cricket World Cup
 A Dog Named Palma (Russian: Пальма) (2021) – Russian children's drama film based on real events that took place in 1974-1976 at the Moscow's Vnukovo International Airport
 A Journal for Jordan (2021) – drama film based on the memoir A Journal for Jordan: A Story of Love and Honor by Dana Canedy
 A Very British Scandal (2021) – British historical-drama miniseries depicting the story of events surrounding the notorious divorce of the Duke and Duchess of Argyll during the 1960s
 Aik Hai Nigaar (2021) – Pakistani made-for-television biographical drama film based on three-star general of Pakistan Army, Nigar Johar and centers on her life and career from 1975 (when Johar was young) to present time
 Aileen Wuornos: American Boogeywoman (2021) – horror thriller film based on the facts of the biography of serial killer Aileen Wuornos and supplemented with elements of fiction
 Aline (2021) – musical comedy-drama film depicting a fictionalized portrayal of the life of Céline Dion
 All Our Fears (Polish: Wszystkie nasze strachy) (2021) – Polish biographical film based on the catholic gay activist Daniel Rycharski
 American Underdog (2021) – biographical sports film about National Football League (NFL) quarterback Kurt Warner's journey as an undrafted player who ascended to winning Super Bowl XXXIV
 American Traitor: The Trial of Axis Sally (2021) – drama film based on the life of Mildred Gillars, an American singer and actor who during World War II broadcast Nazi propaganda to US troops and their families back home
 Amina (2021) – Nigerian biographical action film about the life of 16th century Zazzau empire warrior Queen Amina
 Anita (Chinese: 梅艷芳) (2021) – Hong Kong biographical musical drama film about Cantopop star Anita Mui
 Anne Boleyn (2021) – British psychological thriller miniseries set in Anne's final five months prior to her execution by beheading for treason in 1536.
 Asakusa Kid (Japanese: 	浅草キッド) (2021) – Japanese biographical drama film based on the apprenticeship of Takeshi Kitano by Senzaburo Fukami, and adapted from Kitano's 1988 memoir of the same name.
 The Auschwitz Report (Slovak: Správa) (2021) – Slovak biographical drama film based on the true story of Rudolf Vrba and Alfréd Wetzler, two prisoners at the Auschwitz concentration camp who manage to escape with details about the camp's operation including a label from a canister of the pesticide Zyklon-B, used in the murders there
 Baggio: The Divine Ponytail (Italian: Il Divin Codino) (2021) – Italian biographical sports film based on real life events of Italian footballer Roberto Baggio
 Being the Ricardos (2021) – biographical drama film about the relationship between I Love Lucy stars Lucille Ball and Desi Arnaz
 Benedetta (2021) – biographical drama film based on Benedetta Carlini, a novice nun in the 17th century who joins an Italian convent and has a lesbian love affair with another nun
 Benediction (2021) – historical drama biographical film about Siegfried Sassoon
 Bhuj: The Pride of India (2021) – Indian Hindi-language biographical film depicts the true story of Indian Air Force Squadron Leader Vijay Karnik — then in-charge of the Bhuj Air Force Base who, with the help of 300 local women, reconstructed the damaged landing strip in 72 hours
 The Big Bull (2021) – Indian Hindi-language financial thriller film based on stockbroker Harshad Mehta who was involved in financial crimes over a period of 10 years during 1980–1990.
 The Billion Dollar Code (2021) – German miniseries based on the true story of an artist and a hacker invented "ART+COM". Years later, they reunite to sue Google for patent infringement on it.
 Blue Miracle (2021) – drama film depicting a guardian and his kids partner with a washed-up boat captain for a chance to win a lucrative fishing competition in an attempt to save their orphanage
 Body Brokers (2021) – crime thriller film based on the true story of a recovering junkie soon learns that the rehab center is not about helping people, but a cover for a multi-billion-dollar fraud operation that enlists addicts to recruit other addicts
 Break Every Chain (2021) – Christian biographical drama film based on the autobiographical novel of the same name by Jonathan Hickory
 Charlotte (2021) – Canadian-Belgian-French animated biographical drama film about German painter Charlotte Salomon
 Chernobyl: Abyss (Russian: Чернобыль) (2021) – Russian disaster film about a firefighter who becomes a liquidator during the Chernobyl disaster
 Colin in Black & White (2021) – Biographical drama miniseries depicting a dramatization of the teenage years of athlete Colin Kaepernick and the experiences that led him to become an activist.
 The Colour Room (2021) – British biographical drama film based on the life of 1920s/30s ceramic artist Clarice Cliff
 Come from Away (2021) – biographical drama musical film which tells the true story of 7,000 airline passengers who were stranded in a small town in Newfoundland, where they were housed and welcomed, after the 9/11 terrorist attacks
 Creation Stories (2021) – biographical film about Alan McGee and Creation Records
 Death Saved My Life (2021) – made-for-television thriller film inspired on the story of Noela Rukundo
 Deceit (2021) – British crime drama, thriller miniseries based on the true story of a controversial undercover operation carried out by the Metropolitan Police in 1992 
 The Dig (2021) – British drama film based on the 2007 novel of the same name by John Preston, which reimagines the events of the 1939 excavation of Sutton Hoo
 Dopesick (2021) – drama miniseries on "the epicenter of America's struggle with opioid addiction" across the U.S., on how individuals and families are affected by it, on the alleged conflicts of interest involving Purdue Pharma and various government agencies 
 Edge of the World (2021) – adventure drama film based on the British soldier and adventurer James Brooke
 Eiffel (2021) – French romantic drama film depicting the life of Gustave Eiffel
 The Electrical Life of Louis Wain (2021) – British biographical film depicting the life of British painter Louis Wain
 Escape from Mogadishu (Korean: Mogadisyu) (2021) – South Korean action drama film set during the Somali Civil War and the two Koreas' efforts to be admitted to the United Nations in the late 1980s and early 1990s and depicts details of perilous escape attempt made by North and South Korean embassy workers stranded during the conflict
 Everybody's Talking About Jamie (2021) – biographical coming-of-age musical comedy-drama film based upon the true-life story of 16-year-old British schoolboy Jamie Campbell, as he overcomes prejudice and bullying, to step out of the darkness and become a drag queen
 Everything Went Fine (French: Tout s'est bien passé) (2021) – French drama film about a young woman as she is confronted with her father's declining health, and his request for her help in committing medically assisted suicide
 The Eyes of Tammy Faye (2021) – biographical drama film based on the 2000 documentary of the same name by Fenton Bailey and Randy Barbato, the film depicts the history of controversial televangelists Tammy Faye Bakker and Jim Bakker
 Firebird (2021) – romantic drama film based on the memoir The Story of Roman by Sergey Fetisov, which is set during the Cold War
 Flag Day (2021) – drama film depicting the daughter of a con artist struggles to come to terms with her father's past, involving the fourth-largest seizure of counterfeit bills in U.S. history, nearly $20 million. Based on Jennifer Vogel's 2004 book, Flim-Flam Man : A True Family History.
 Halston (2021) – biographical drama miniseries based on the life of designer Halston
 Hive (Albanian: Zgjoi) (2021) – Kosovan drama film about a woman, Fahrije, with a missing husband, who becomes an entrepreneur and starts selling her own ajvar and honey, recruiting other women in the process
 House of Gucci (2021) – biographical crime drama film based on the 2001 book The House of Gucci: A Sensational Story of Murder, Madness, Glamour, and Greed by Sara Gay Forden
 I Am All Girls (2021) – South African mystery thriller film depicting a special crimes investigator forms an unlikely bond with a serial killer to bring down a global child sex trafficking syndicate
 Judas and the Black Messiah (2021) – biographical drama film about the betrayal of Fred Hampton, chairman of the Illinois chapter of the Black Panther Party in late-1960s Chicago, at the hands of William O'Neal, an FBI informant
 The King of Laughter (Italian: Qui rido io) (2021) – Italian-Spanish biographical drama film about actor and playwright Eduardo Scarpetta's legal battle against Gabriele D'Annunzio
 King Richard (2021) – biographical drama film that follows the life of Richard Williams, the father and coach of famed tennis players Venus and Serena Williams
 Kurup (2021) – Indian biopic of Sukumara Kurup, a wanted notorious criminal from the Indian state of Kerala
 The Lady of Heaven (2021) – British epic historical drama film on the life of the historical figure, Fatimah, during and after the era of the Islamic prophet Muhammad. In addition to the Islamic story of 7th century, the film also deals with Islamic State in the 21st century and the origins of Islamic terrorism
 Landscapers (2021) – British true crime black comedy-drama miniseries based on the true story of the 1998 murders of William and Patricia Wycherley
 Lansky (2021) – biographical crime drama about the famous gangster Meyer Lansky
 The Last Duel (2021) – historical drama film based on the 2004 book of the same name by Eric Jager, set in medieval France, the film follows Jean de Carrouges, a knight who challenges his friend and squire Jacques Le Gris to a duel after Carrouges's wife, Marguerite, accuses Le Gris of raping her
 Leave No Traces (Polish: Żeby nie było śladów) (2021) – Polish drama film based on the state-sanctioned murder of high school student Grzegorz Przemyk
 Madame Claude (2021) – French biographical film about the infamous French brothel-keeper Madame Claude
 Maid (2021) – biographical drama miniseries inspired by New York Times best-selling memoir Maid: Hard Work, Low Pay, and a Mother's Will to Survive by Stephanie Land which tells the story of Land's experience of working as a maid walking the tightrope of poverty and homelessness for years chasing the American dream
 Man of God (Greek: Ο Άνθρωπος του Θεού) (2021) – Greek biographical drama film depicting the trials and tribulations of Saint Nektarios of Aegina, as he bears the unjust hatred of his enemies while preaching the Word of God
 Marakkar: Lion of the Arabian Sea (Malayalam: Marakkar: Arabikadalinte Simham) (2021) – Indian epic war film set in the 16th century Calicut, the film is based on the fourth Kunjali Marakkar named Muhammad Ali, the admiral of the fleet of the Zamorin
 Margrete: Queen of the North (Danish: Margrete den Første) (2021) – Danish historical drama film based on the 'False Oluf', an impostor who in 1402 claimed to be the deceased King Olaf II/Olav IV of Denmark-Norway, son of the title character Margrete I of Denmark
 The Mauritanian (2021) – British/American legal thriller film following Mauritanian Mohamedou Ould Salahi, who was captured by the U.S. government and detained in Guantanamo Bay detention camp without charge or trial
 Mediterraneo: The Law of the Sea (2021) – Spanish-Greek drama film dramatizing the genesis of the Open Arms rescue vessel by Òscar Camps
 The Most Reluctant Convert (2021) – British biographical drama film about the life and conversion of British writer and lay theologian C. S. Lewis, author of The Chronicles of Narnia series
 Mumbai Diaries 26/11 (2021) – Indian miniseries set during the 2008 Mumbai attacks, it follows the staff of Bombay General Hospital and their travails during the fateful night of November 26, 2008
 Munich – The Edge of War (2021) – German/British drama film based upon the 2017 novel Munich by Robert Harris
 Nitram (2021) – Australian biographical psychological drama film based on Martin Bryant, and the events leading to his involvement in the 1996 Port Arthur massacre in Tasmania, Australia
 No Man of God (2021) – crime mystery film based on real life transcripts selected from conversations between serial killer Ted Bundy and FBI Special Agent Bill Hagmaier that happened between 1984 and 1989
 Nyaay: The Justice (2021) – Indian Hindi-language biographical drama film based on Sushant Singh Rajput and Rhea Chakraborty
 Onoda: 10,000 Nights in the Jungle (French: Onoda, 10 000 nuits dans la jungle) (2021) – French highly fictionalized biographical drama film about Hiroo Onoda, a Japanese soldier who refused to believe that World War II had ended and continued to fight on a remote Philippine island until 1974
 Oslo (2021) – made-for-television drama film about the secret negotiation of the Oslo Accords
 Paper (Hindi: Kaagaz) (2021) – Indian Hindi-language biographical comedy film based on the life and struggle of Lal Bihari, a farmer from the small village of Amilo Mubarakpur, who was declared dead on official papers
 Passport to Freedom (Portuguese: Passaporte para Liberdade) (2021) – Brazilian miniseries telling the story of Aracy de Carvalho, an employee of the Brazilian consulate in Hamburg, Germany. 
 The Pembrokeshire Murders (2021) – British three-part television drama miniseries, based on the Pembrokeshire murders by Welsh serial killer John Cooper
 The Phantom of the Open (2021) – British biographical comedy-drama film based on the life and career of Maurice Flitcroft
 The Pilot. A Battle for Survival (Russian: Лётчик) (2021) – Russian WWII film based on the real story of pilot Aleksey Maresyev
 Respect (2021) – biographical drama film based on the life of American singer Aretha Franklin
 Saina (2021) – Indian biographical sports film based on the life of badminton player Saina Nehwal
 Sardar Udham (2021) – Indian Hindi-language biographical historical drama film based on the life of Udham Singh Kamboj , a freedom fighter from Punjab who assassinated Michael O'Dwyer in London to avenge the 1919 Jallianwala Bagh massacre in Amritsar
 The Serpent (2021) – British crime drama eight-part mini-series based on the crimes of serial killer Charles Sobhraj, who murdered young tourists between 1975 and 1976
 Shershaah (2021) – Indian Hindi-language biographical war film following the life of Param Vir Chakra-awardee Captain Vikram Batra, from his first posting in the army to his death in the Kargil War
 The Shrink Next Door (2021) –  psychological black comedy-drama miniseries based on the real life story of psychiatrist Isaac Herschkopf, who in 2021 was determined by New York's Department of Health to have violated "minimal acceptable standards of care in the psychotherapeutic relationship"
 Sky (Russian: Небо) (2021) – Russian aviation action war film about the Russian military pilots in Syria, and the 2015 shootdown of an Su-24 over Turkey-Syrian airspace 
 Somos. (2021) – Mexican miniseries depicting the story of the massacre perpetrated by the Los Zetas cartel on the border town of Allende, Coahuila, in 2011.
 Spencer (2021) – biographical psychological drama film about Diana, Princess of Wales (née Spencer), and follows Diana's decision to end her marriage to Prince Charles and leave the British royal family
 The Summit of the Gods (French: Le Sommet des Dieux) (2021) – French animated film about George Mallory and Andrew Irvine and their attempt to climb Mount Everest
 The Survivor (2021) – biographical drama film depictuing the story of Harry Haft, a real-life survivor of the Auschwitz concentration camp, where he boxed fellow inmates to survive
 Ted Bundy: American Boogeyman (2021) – historical Crime film based on the life of serial killer Ted Bundy
 Ted K (2021) – historical crime drama film depicting the true story of Ted Kaczynski, otherwise known as the Unabomber, and the events leading to his arrest
 Thalaivii (2021) – Indian biographical drama film based on the life of Indian actress-politician J. Jayalalithaa
 Three Families (2021) – British drama miniseries set in Northern Ireland between 2013 and 2019 when abortion was de-facto decriminalised, it is a dramatisation of true stories from families who were affected by its restrictive abortion laws
 Tick, Tick... Boom! (2021) – biographical musical drama film based on the stage musical of the same name by Jonathan Larson, a semi-autobiographical story about Larson's writing a musical to enter the industry
 To Olivia (2021) – drama film depicting the true story of Roald Dahl and Patricia Neal as they grapple with the loss of their daughter, Olivia
 Under the Stadium Lights (2021) – sports drama film based on the nonfiction book Brother's Keeper by Al Pickett and Chad Mitchell, about the players, coach, and team chaplain of a high school football team in Abilene, Texas in 2009
 The United States vs. Billie Holiday (2021) – biographical film about singer Billie Holiday, based on the book Chasing the Scream: The First and Last Days of the War on Drugs by Johann Hari
 The Unknown Man (2021) – Australian crime thriller film about two strangers who meet and strike up a friendship, while one of them is a veteran undercover police officer working to secure a conviction for an unsolved murder committed years earlier
 V2. Escape from Hell (2021) – Russian prison action thriller war biopic film based on Mikhail Devyatayev in the Great Patriotic War
 The War Below (2021) – British war film about a group of British miners (known as "Claykickers" or "Manchester Moles") recruited during World War I to tunnel underneath no man's land and set bombs below the German front at the Battle of Messines in 1917
 Wendy Williams: The Movie (2021) – made-for-television biographical film based on the life of entertainer Wendy Williams
 Zátopek (2021) – Czech biographical drama film depicting the life and career of Emil Zátopek
 Zero to Hero (Chinese: 媽媽的神奇小子) (2021) – Hong Kong biographical drama film about So Wa Wai, Hong Kong's first athlete to win gold at the Paralympic Games

2022 
 42 Days of Darkness (Spanish: 42 días en la oscuridad) (2022) – Chilean biographical drama miniseries based on the true story of the disappearance in 2010 of Viviana Haeger and on the search for answers undertaken by her sister, Cecilia
 892 (2022) – thriller drama film about the final day of the life of war veteran Lance Corporal Brian Brown-Easley
 A Friend of the Family (2022) – drama miniseries based on the true events of Robert Berchtold, a close friend of the Broberg family, who kidnaps Jan Broberg twice over a period of two years
 Abraham Lincoln (2022) – Historical drama miniseries chronicling the life of Abraham Lincoln, the sixteenth President of the United States
 Against the Ice (2022) – historical survival film based on the true story recounted in Two Against the Ice by Ejnar Mikkelsen
 All Quiet on the Western Front (2022) – German-British anti-war film describing the German soldiers' extreme physical and mental stress during the war, and the detachment from civilian life felt by many of these soldiers upon returning home from the front 
 American Murderer (2022) – American true-crime drama based on the true story of Jason Derek Brown - a charismatic con man turned party king who bankrolls his luxurious lifestyle through a series of scams
 Amsterdam (2022) – Historical comedy thriller film based on the Business Plot, a 1933 political conspiracy in the US
 Angelyne (2022) – biographical drama miniseries about Angelyne, an enigmatic blonde bombshell who rose to fame in the 1980s with billboard advertisements featuring her image and a journalists endeavours trying to uncover her true identity and life story
 Anne (2022) – British historical drama miniseries revolving around the Hillsborough disaster of 1989 and its aftermath
 Apollo 10 1⁄2: A Space Age Childhood (2022) – animated coming-of-age film loosely based on the childhood of writer, director, and producer Richard Linklater
 Argentina, 1985 (2022) – Argentine-American based on real events, the story follows the events surrounding the 1985 Trial of the Juntas, which prosecuted the ringleaders of Argentina's last civil-military dictatorship (1976–1983), and centers on the titanic work of a group of lawyers led by prosecutors Julio César Strassera and Luis Moreno Ocampo against those responsible for the most bloody dictatorship in the history of Argentina
 Babylon (2022) – Epic period comedy-drama film chronicling the rise and fall of multiple characters during Hollywood's transition from silent films to sound films in the late 1920s
 Bali 2002 (2022) – Australian-Indonesian drama miniseries revolving around the 2002 Bali bombings
 Bandit (2022) – Canadian biographical crime film based on the true life story of Gilbert Galvan Jr (also known as The Flying Bandit), who still holds a record for the most consecutive robberies in Canadian history
 Becoming Elizabeth (2022) – historical drama miniseries following the younger years of Queen Elizabeth I
 Black Bird (2022) – crime drama miniseries telling the real-life story of convicted drug dealer Jimmy Keene who is forced to get a confession out of suspected serial murderer Larry Hall while in a maximum-security prison
 Blonde (2022) – biographical drama film about actress, model and singer Marilyn Monroe
 The Bohemian (Italian: Il Boemo) (2022) – Italian biographical drama film about the life and career of the Czech composer Josef Mysliveček
 Candy (2022) – biographical crime drama miniseries depicting the real-life Candy Montgomery, who was accused of the axe murder of her neighbor, Betty Gore in 1980, in Texas
 Chevalier (2022) – biographical film based on the life of the titular French-Caribbean musician Chevalier de Saint-Georges
 Clark (2022) – Swedish drama miniseries based on the life of Clark Olofsson and includes the events of the Norrmalmstorg robbery
 Corsage (2022) – drama film depicting an account of the later years of Empress Elisabeth of Austria
 Dahmer – Monster: The Jeffrey Dahmer Story (2022) – biographical crime drama miniseries following the murders of infamous serial killer Jeffrey Dahmer as told from a point of view style through the lens of his victims
 Dalíland (2022) – biographical film bout the tempestuous marriage of the painter Salvador Dalí and his wife and muse, Gala, in their later years in the 1970s
 Devil in Ohio (2022) – Suspense thriller miniseries inspired by true events from a story about a fragile teenager who flees from a cult into the arms of a psychiatrist, and mother of three
 Devotion (2022) – war drama film about the comradeship between naval officers Jesse Brown and Tom Hudner who become the U.S. Navy’s most celebrated wingmen during the Korean War
 Dharmaveer (2022) – Indian Marathi-language biographical political drama film based on the story of late Shiv Sena leader Anand Dighe
 Dreamin' Wild (2022) – biographical drama film following the life and work of Donnie and Joe Emerson
 The Dropout (2022) – drama miniseries chronicling Theranos founder Elizabeth Holmes' attempt to revolutionize the healthcare industry after dropping out of college and starting a technology company
 Elesin Oba, The King's Horseman (2022) – Nigerian biographical drama film based on true life events of Elesin Oba, the king's chief horseman, in the 1940s Oyo State who must perform ritual suicide in light of the death of the King
 Elvis (2022) – biographical musical drama film about singer and actor Elvis Presley
 Emancipation (2022) – dramatic historical action thriller film based on the real-life story of Gordon (named "Peter" in the film), a former slave, and the photographs of his bare back, heavily scourged from an overseer's whippings, that were published worldwide in 1863, giving the abolitionist movement proof of the cruelty of slavery
 Emergency Situation (Czech: Mimořádná událost) (2022) – Czech comedy film based on a real event, when in February 2019, a train with passengers ran several kilometers without a driver on the Křižanov–Studenec railway line.
 Emily (2022) – biographical drama film depicting the brief life of English writer Emily Brontë
 Father Stu (2022) – biographical drama film following the true-life story of Father Stuart Long
 The First Lady (2022) – anthology drama miniseries portraying the life and family events of three First Ladies of the United States: Eleanor Roosevelt, Betty Ford, and Michelle Obama
 Fisherman's Friends: One and All (2022) – British comedy-drama film about the famous sea shanty singing group from Port Isaac, Cornwall
 Five Days at Memorial (2022) – disaster medical drama television miniseries depicting the difficulties a New Orleans hospital endures after Hurricane Katrina makes landfall on the city
 Four Lives (2022) – British drama miniseries following the true story of the families of four young gay men who in 2014 and 2015 were murdered by Stephen Port
 Gangubai Kathiawadi (2022) – Indian Hindi-language biographical crime drama film based on the true story of Gangubai Kothewali
 Gaslit (2022) – political thriller miniseries focusing on Martha Mitchell, a celebrity Arkansan socialite and wife to Nixon’s loyal Attorney General, John N. Mitchell during the Watergate scandal
 The Girl from Plainville (2022) – drama miniseries based on the events leading to the death of Conrad Roy and his girlfriend Michelle Carter's conviction for involuntary manslaughter.
 Girl in the Shed: The Kidnapping of Abby Hernandez (2022) – made-for-television film depicting the kidnapping of 14-year-old Abby Hernandez
 The Good Nurse (2022) – crime drama film depicting the story of Charles Cullen, an American serial killer who confessed to murdering up to 40 patients during the course of his 16-year career as a nurse in New Jersey
 The Greatest Beer Run Ever (2022) – biographical war action comedy-drama film based on the book of the same name by Joanna Molloy and John "Chickie" Donohue
 Head Bush (2022) – Indian Kannada-language political-crime drama film about M. P. Jayaraj 
 Home Team (2022) – sports comedy film about New Orleans Saints head coach Sean Payton who coached his 12-year-old son's football team during his one-year suspension from the NFL
 How We Roll (2022) – Sitcom inspired by the life of professional bowler Tom Smallwood
 Infinite Storm (2022) – drama adventure film based on a true story of Pam Bales, a mountain guide who set out on a solitary trek up Mount Washington in October 2010 and the rescue of an incoherent man she encounters
 The Inspection (2022) – American drama film inspired by Bratton's real-life experiences, the film follows a young man who faces homophobia, both at a Marines boot camp and at home from his mother
 Inventing Anna (2022) – drama miniseries inspired by the story of Anna Sorokin, a con artist and fraudster who posed as a wealthy German heiress to access the upper echelons of the New York social and art scenes from 2013 to 2017
 Jerry & Marge Go Large (2022) – comedy-drama film based on Jason Fagone's 2018 HuffPost article of the same name
 Jhund (2022) – Indian Hindi-language biographical film based on the life of Vijay Barse, the founder of NGO Slum Soccer
 Joe vs. Carole (2022) – drama limited series following the criminal case of Joe Exotic, a zookeeper who has been convicted of murder-for-hire
 The Kashmir Files (2022) – Indian Hindi-language drama film centred around the 1990s exodus of Kashmiri Hindus from Indian-administered Kashmir.centred around the 1990s exodus of Kashmiri Hindus from Indian-administered Kashmir
 Kingmaker (Korean: 킹메이커) (2022) – Korean political drama film based on anecdotal accounts of the working relationship between Kim Dae-jung and his political strategist Uhm Chang-rok during his political career
 Lamborghini: The Man Behind the Legend (2022) – biographical drama about Italian entrepreneur Ferruccio Lamborghini
 The Last Race (Czech: Poslední závod) (2022) – Czech historical sports drama film story of Bohumil Hanč and Václav Vrbata who died during a 1913 race in Giant Mountains.
 Litvinenko (2022) – British miniseries depicting a dramatisation of the 10-year fight of Marina Litvinenko and the London police force as they work to prove the guilt and release the names of those responsible for the 2006 poisoning of Alexander Litvinenko
 The Lost King (2022) – British comedy-drama based on the 2013 book The King's Grave: The Search for Richard III by Philippa Langley and Michael K. Jones
 Major (2022) – Indian biographical action drama film following the life of Major Sandeep Unnikrishnan, an army officer who was killed in the 2008 Mumbai attacks
 Mat Kilau (2022) – Malaysian biographical historical epic film based on Mat Kilau bin Imam Rasu, a Malay warrior who fought the British colonialists during the Pahang Uprising in Pahang, British Malaya before independence
 Medieval (2022) – Czech historical action drama film about the life of Jan Žižka, a Bohemian military commander who never lost a battle
 Mike (2022) – biographical sports drama miniseries centering on the life of boxer Mike Tyson
 My Son Hunter (2022) – biographical drama film about Hunter Biden, the son of US president Joe Biden and how, in 2021, Donald Trump accused Hunter Biden of corruption
 Narco-Saints (Korean: 수리남) (2022) – Korean drama miniseries depicting the true story of an ordinary entrepreneur who has no choice but to risk his life in joining the secret mission of government agents to capture a Korean drug lord operating in Suriname
 Norbourg (2022) – Canadian drama film based on the real-life Norbourg scandal of 2005
 Notre-Dame on Fire (French: Notre-Dame brûle) (2022) – French disaster film based on the Notre-Dame de Paris fire that occurred on 15 April 2019
 The Offer (2022) – biographical drama miniseries about the development and production of Francis Ford Coppola's landmark New York City gangster film The Godfather
 Olympics (Spanish: 42 segundos) (2022) – Spanish sports drama film depicting a dramatization of the Spain men's national water polo team's run at the 1992 Summer Olympics in Barcelona
 Operation Mincemeat (2022) – British war drama film based upon Ben Macintyre's book on the British Operation Mincemeat during the Second World War
 Oussekine (2022) – French drama miniseries based on the events of December 5, 1986 which led to the assassination of Malik Oussekine, a young 22-year-old student, by police
 Padre Pio (2022) – Italian-German biographical drama film following Roman Catholic Saint Padre Pio in his early years
 Pam & Tommy (2022) – biographical drama miniseries chronicling the marriage between actress Pamela Anderson and Mötley Crüe drummer Tommy Lee
 Pistol (2022) – biographical drama miniseries that follows Sex Pistols guitarist Steve Jones and the band's rise to prominence and notoriety
 The Playlist (2022) – drama miniseries based on the story of the birth of the Swedish music streaming company, Spotify along with its early challenges
 Ponniyin Selvan: I (2022) – Indian Tamil-language epic period drama film revolving around the early life of Chola Prince Arulmozhi Varman who was later known as the great Chola emperor Raja Raja Chola
 Prizefighter: The Life of Jem Belcher (2022) – British-American biographical drama film exploring the life of Jem Belcher who became the youngest ever world champion in boxing
 Rescued by Ruby (2022) – biographical drama film following a state trooper named Dan, who dreams of joining the K-9 search and rescue team of the state police, however has been unsuccessful in doing so until he befriends a shelter dog named Ruby
 Rhinegold (German: Rheingold) (2022) – German biographical gangster drama film based on the life of Iranian-Kurdish hip-hop rapper, entrepreneur, and ex-convict Giwar Hajabi
 Rise (2022) – biographical sports-drama film based on the true story of three young Nigerian-Greek brothers, Giannis, Thanasis and Kostas Antetokounmpo, who emigrate to the United States and rise to fame and success within the National Basketball Association
 Rocketry: The Nambi Effect (2022) – Indian biographical drama film based on the life of Nambi Narayanan, a former scientist and aerospace engineer of the Indian Space Research Organisation who was falsely accused of espionage
 Rogue Agent (2022) – British thriller film based on the article "Chasing Agent Freegard" by Michael Bronner
 RRR (2022) – Indian Telugu-language epic period action drama film about two Indian revolutionaries, Alluri Sitarama Raju and Komaram Bheem, and their fight against the British Raj
 Samrat Prithviraj (2022) – Indian Hindi-language historical action drama film based on the life of Prithviraj Chauhan, a Rajput king from the Chahamana dynasty
 SAS: Rogue Heroes (2022) – British historical drama miniseries depicting the formation of the Special Air Service during World War II
 Save the Cinema (2022) – British comedy-drama film based on the true story of Liz Evans on her quest to save her local theater
 Shabaash Mithu (2022) – Indian Hindi-language biographical sports drama film based on the life of former Test and ODI captain of the India women's national cricket team, Mithali Raj
 She Said (2022) – drama film depicting the work done by journalists Jodi Kantor and Megan Twohey to break the story of Harvey Weinstein's sexual misconduct allegations
 Silverton Siege (2022) – South African film based on the real life siege that took place in Silverton, Pretoria in 1980
 Simone Veil, A Woman of the Century (2022) – French biographical drama film which explores the life of [Simone Veil] - the famous French figure who survived the Holocaust and went on to become a leading politician, human rights campaigner, and feminist - through a series of non-chronological memories 
 The Staircase (2022) – true crime miniseries depicting Michael Peterson, a writer convicted of murdering his wife Kathleen Peterson, who was found dead at the bottom of the staircase in their home
 Studio 666 (2022) – comedy horror film based on a story from Dave Grohl inspired by the Foo Fighters experiences recording their tenth album
 Super Pumped: The Battle for Uber (2022) – drama biopic dramatizing the foundation of the ride-hailing company Uber from the perspective of the company's CEO Travis Kalanick, who is ultimately ousted in a boardroom coup
 The Swimmers (2022) – drama film telling the story of teenage Olympian refugee, Yusra Mardini, who dragged a dinghy of refugees to safety across the Aegean Sea
 Tchaikovsky's Wife (Russian: Жена Чайковского) (2022) – Russian biographical drama film about the wife of the composer Pyotr Ilyich Tchaikovsky
 Thai Cave Rescue (Thai: ถ้ำหลวง: ภารกิจแห่งความหวัง) (2022) – Thai miniseries based on the events of the Tham Luang cave rescue that occurred in Tham Luang-Khun Nam Nang Non National Park during June and July 2018, in which twelve members of the Wild Boars youth football team and their assistant coach were rescued from the flooded Tham Luang Nang Non cave system
 Then Barbara Met Alan (2022) – British television drama film telling the story of two cabaret performers, comedian Barbara and activist-performer Alan who help find DAN, the Disabled People's Direct Action Network and lead protests for disabled people's rights which eventually lead to the Disability Discrimination Act of 1995.
 Theodore Roosevelt (2022) – Historical drama miniseries chronicling the life of Theodore Roosevelt, the twenty-sixth President of the United States
 The Thief, His Wife and the Canoe (2022) – British drama miniseries dramatizing the John Darwin disappearance case, where prison officer and teacher John Darwin hoaxed his own death and reappeared, five and a half years after he was believed to have died in a canoeing accident
 The Thing About Pam (2022) – crime drama miniseries detailing the involvement of Pam Hupp in the 2011 murder of Betsy Faria
 Thirteen Lives (2022) – biographical survival drama film about the events of the 2018 Tham Luang cave rescue that saw a junior football team and their coach trapped in a cave for a period of 18 days
 This England (2022) – British docudrama miniseries depicting the first wave of the COVID-19 pandemic in the United Kingdom based on testimonies of people in the Boris Johnson administration, on the various intergovernmental advisory groups (including the Scientific Advisory Group for Emergencies), and in other affected British institutions such as care homes and hospitals
 Till (2022) – biographical drama film based on the real-life story of Mamie Till-Mobley (Deadwyler), an American educator and activist who pursues justice after the 1955 lynching of her 14-year-old son Emmett Till
 Underbelly: Vanishing Act (2022) – drama miniseries based on the story of high-roller Melissa Caddick who was alleged to have embezzled $40 million before vanishing  in November 2020 the day after the Australian Securities & Investments Commission executed a search warrant on her Dover Heights, Sydney home
 Vardy v Rooney: A Courtroom Drama (2022) – British courtroom drama based on the Wagatha Christie events and subsequent high-profile court case.
 The Wannsee Conference (German: Die Wannseekonferenz) (2022) – German made-for-television docudrama about a conference held in Berlin-Wannsee in 1942 to organise the extermination of the Jews
 The Watcher (2022) – crime drama miniseries following the true story of a married couple who, after moving into their dream home in New Jersey, are harassed through letters signed by a stalker named "The Watcher"
 We Own This City (2022) – crime drama miniseries depicting the rise and fall of the Baltimore Police Department's Gun Trace Task Force and the corruption surrounding it
 WeCrashed (2022) – drama miniseries about Adam and Rebekah Neumann, the real-life married couple at the heart of WeWork, a coworking space company whose valuation reached $47 billion in 2019 before crashing as a result of financial revelations
 Weird: The Al Yankovic Story (2022) – biographical parody film loosely based on Yankovic's life and career as an accordionist and parody songwriter
 Welcome to Chippendales (2022) – drama miniseries telling the origin story of Somen 'Steve' Banerjee, the founder of Chippendales
 Whina – New Zealander biographical film about the life of Dame Whina Cooper
 Whitney Houston: I Wanna Dance with Somebody (2022) – biographical musical drama film about singer and actress Whitney Houston
 Who is Pravin Tambe? (Hindi: Kaun Pravin Tambe?) (2022) – Indian Hindi-language biographical sports drama film based on the life of Indian cricketer Pravin Tambe
 The Woman King (2022) – historical epic film about the Agojie, the all-female warrior unit who protected the African kingdom of Dahomey in the 19th century
 Women of the Movement (2022) – historical drama miniseries based on Mamie Till-Mobley who devoted her life to seeking justice for her murdered son Emmett

2023 
 80 for Brady (2023) – Sports comedy film following four lifelong friends who travel to watch Brady and his New England Patriots play in Super Bowl LI in 2017 inspired by a real-life group of Patriots fans known as the "Over 80 for Brady" club
 Air (2023) – Biographical drama film its plot chronicles the origin of the Air Jordan shoeline; a Nike, Inc. employee seeks to strike a business deal with rookie basketball player Michael Jordan 
 Bank of Dave (2023) – British biographical comedy film based on the story of a Burnley working class and self-made millionaire, who struggles to set up a community bank to help the town's local businesses not only survive, but thrive. To do so, he must battle London's elite financial institutions and compete for the first banking licence in over 100 year
 BlackBerry (2023) – Canadian biopic film about the history of the BlackBerry line of mobile phones
 Boston Strangler (2023) – Historical crime drama film based on the true story of the Boston Strangler, who in the 1960s killed 13 women in Boston, Massachusetts
 Cassandro (2023) – Biographical drama film following the true story of Cassandro, the exotico character created by Saúl Armendáriz, gay amateur wrestler from El Paso who rose to international stardom
 Dark October (2023) – Nigerian film telling the true story of four university students in Nigeria, who went to a particular area in search of a debtor who owed one of them, unfortunately, the debtor raised a false alarm and alleged that the boys came to rob him of his valuables, mobs then paraded the boys as thieves and lynched them, this mob attack however sparked a nationwide crisis.
 Dog Gone (2023) – Biographical drama film based on the book Dog Gone: A Lost Pet’s Extraordinary Journey and the Family Who Brought Him Home by Pauls Toutonghi, itself based on a true story
 Fairyland (2023) – Coming-of-age drama film based on Alysia Abbott's experiences of being raised by her father Steve Abbott, a poet and activist who came out as gay and fell victim to the AIDS crisis
 Flamin' Hot (2023) – Biographical drama film depicting the story of Richard Montañez, the Frito-Lay janitor who claimed to have invented Flamin' Hot Cheetos
 Golda (2023) – American-British biographical drama film depicting the life of Golda Meir, Prime Minister of Israel, particularly during the Yom Kippur War
 Miranda's Victim (2023) – Crime-drama film based on the life of Patricia "Trish" Weir, who was kidnapped and raped by Ernesto Miranda in 1963
 Mission Majnu (2023) – Indian Hindi-language spy thriller film based on true events from the 1970s, an undercover Indian spy takes on a deadly mission to expose a covert nuclear weapons program in the heart of Pakistan
 Nolly (2023) – British biographical miniseries exploring the reign, and fall from grace of British soap opera star Noele Gordon.
 Oppenheimer (2023) – Biographical film follows the life of theoretical physicist J. Robert Oppenheimer, the director of the Los Alamos Laboratory during the Manhattan Project, and his contributions that led to the creation of the atomic bomb
 Reba McEntire's The Hammer (2023) – Biographical drama television film inspired by the life of Kim Wanker, one of the last traveling circuit judges in the U.S.
 Sisi & I (German: Sisi & Ich) (2023) – German-Swiss-Austrian biographical film telling the story of Empress Elisabeth of Austria from the point of view of her lady-in-waiting, Irma Sztáray, during a period in which the Empress was separated from her husband for many years and was surrounded only by other women, travelling throughout Europe, mastering six languages and practising high-performance sports
 Stonehouse (2023) – British biographical comedy-drama miniseries dramatising the life and times of disgraced British government minister John Stonehouse
 Tetris (2023) – Biographical drama film the true story of the high-stakes legal battle to secure the intellectual property rights to Tetris
 True Spirit (2023) – Australian biopic film based on the true story of Jessica Watson, an Australian sailor who was awarded the Order of Australia Medal after attempting a solo global circumnavigation at the age of 16

References

External links 
 History at the Movies: Historical and Period Films
 Internet Movie Database list
 Films based on historical events and people

 2020s
Actual events
Lists of historical films